Meting Railway Station (Sindhi: ميٽنگ ريلوي اسٽيشن) is located in Meting village, Thatta district of Sindh province of the Pakistan.

See also
 List of railway stations in Pakistan
 Pakistan Railways

References

External links

Railway stations in Thatta District
Railway stations on Karachi–Peshawar Line (ML 1)